Adenophyllum is a small genus of plants in the tribe Tageteae within the family Asteraceae. It contains ten species known generally as dogweeds.

These are gangly, daisylike or thistlelike plants with yellow or reddish flowers. They are native primarily to the southwestern United States and northern Mexico, where they are most common in desert regions.

 Species
 Adenophyllum anomalum (Canby & Rose) Strother - Sonora, Sinaloa, Durango
 Adenophyllum appendiculatum (Lag.) Strother - 	Chiapas, Oaxaca, Guerrero, Colima, Michoacán, Guerrero
 Adenophyllum aurantium (L.) Strother - Oaxaca
 Adenophyllum cooperi (A.Gray) Strother - Cooper's dyssodia, Cooper's dogweed - United States (California Nevada Arizona Utah)
 Adenophyllum glandulosum (Cav.) Strother - Oaxaca
 Adenophyllum porophylloides (A.Gray) Strother - San Felipe dogweed - Baja California, Baja California Sur, Sonora, United States (California Nevada Arizona)
 Adenophyllum porophyllum (Cav.) Hemsl. - poreleaf dogweed - Mexico, Central America, Cuba, United States (Cochise County in Arizona)
 Adenophyllum pulcherrimum 
 Adenophyllum speciosum (A.Gray) Strother - Baja California, Baja California Sur
 Adenophyllum squamosum (A.Gray) Strother - Jalisco, Nayarit, Sinaloa, Colima
 Adenophyllum wrightii A.Gray - Wright's dogweed - Mexico, United States (Arizona New Mexico)
 Adenophyllum yecoranum

References

External links 
 USDA Plants Profile
 Jepson Manual Treatment
 

Tageteae
Asteraceae genera
Flora of North America